Thomas C. Buchanan (born 1960) is a British historian. He has been a Fellow of Kellogg College, Oxford, since 1991, and in 2014 he was awarded the title of Professor of Modern British and European History by the University of Oxford. He specialises in foreign influences on British left-wing politics (particularly the Spanish Civil War and China); Catholic politics, conflict and peace in modern Europe; and humanitarianism in post-war Britain.

Early life and education 
Born in 1960, Buchanan studied history at Wadham College, Oxford, graduating with a BA in 1982. He then carried out doctoral studies at St Antony's College, Oxford; his DPhil was awarded in 1987 for his thesis "British trade union internationalism and the Spanish Civil War".

Career 
In 1990, Buchanan was appointed a University Lecturer in Modern History and Politics at the University of Oxford and Director of Studies for History and Politics at the Department for Continuing Education. Since 1991, he has also been a fellow of Kellogg College, Oxford. In 2014, he was awarded the title of Professor of Modern British and European History by the University of Oxford.

Bibliography

References 

Living people
1960 births
British historians
Alumni of Wadham College, Oxford
Alumni of St Antony's College, Oxford
Fellows of Kellogg College, Oxford